Autoroute 530 (A-530) is an autoroute located Salaberry-de-Valleyfield, Montérégie, Quebec. The  spur route links Autoroute 30 with Salaberry-de-Valleyfield and features two interchanges, one at Boulevard Pie XII and the other at Route 201.

Autoroute 530 was originally part of Autoroute 30, but was re-designated in 2012 when A-30 was realigned to cross the St. Lawrence River.

Exit list
From west to east.

Photo gallery

References

External links

 Transports Quebec Map 

530